Bhuwan Kumar Pathak (Nepali: भुवन कुमार पाठक, born 1958) is a Nepalese politician who is currently serving as Speaker of Bagmati Provincial Assembly. He is a member of the Bagmati Provincial Assembly, having been elected as a proportional representative from the Khas people category in the 2022 Provincial Assembly election.<ref></ref<ref></ref>

References

Nepalese politicians
1958 births
Living people